Onni Group is primarily a real estate development company, headquartered in Vancouver. The company has built a variety of residential, commercial, and rental projects across Canada and the United States for various uses. The company started investing in the US in 2010 by acquiring apartment properties in Phoenix. Since its initial investments in the US, the Onni Group has become one of LA's biggest developers.

Projects

United States

1120 Denny Way, a pair of 41-story residential highrises in South Lake Union, Seattle, Washington
Redevelopment of the Los Angeles Times Building
Redevelopment of the Seattle Times Building

Other properties

1411 Fourth Avenue Building, a historic office building in Seattle, Washington
121 Boren Avenue North: 40-story apartment building cancelled due to COVID-19 pandemic.

Criticism

Onni was fined $24,000 by the City of Vancouver in May 2017 for the operation of illegal short-term rentals at The Level, located at 1022 Seymour Street, despite warnings from the city that date back over a year.

In 2016 Onni were ordered to pay back $1.5 million to the City of Vancouver. An investigation found that City staff approved the DCL waiver for the Charleson Project in error.

References

Real estate companies of Canada
Real estate companies established in 1965
Companies based in Vancouver
1965 establishments in Canada